Laurence Oliphant (1691–1767) was a Jacobite army officer who belonged to a branch settled at Findo Gask in Perthshire, Scotland. He took part in the Jacobite rising of 1715, and both he and his son Laurence (died 1792) were actively concerned in the rising of 1745. Oliphant senior served as Governor of Perth during the advance to Derby and both were present at the battles of Falkirk and Culloden.

The Laird of Gask and his son were among the Jacobites who regrouped at Ruthven Barracks after the defeat at Culloden.  After the remnant of the Jacobite army dispersed, they went into hiding in the Angus Glens for seven months before taking ship from Arbroath for Amsterdam on 5 November 1746, and from there to Sweden.  From there they travelled to France where they lived mostly at Corbeil, near Versailles. On 14 July 1760 Oliphant was created Lord Oliphant in the Jacobite peerage. He returned to Scotland in 1763 and spent the last years of his life quietly on his Gask estate. He died in 1767.

In 1723 Oliphant married Amelia Murray (1698 - 1774), a daughter of William Murray, second Lord Nairne.  His descendants include Carolina, Baroness Nairne and from his sister Lilias, who married Laurence Oliphant (5th) of Condie are descended Laurence Oliphant the author, MP and diplomat and Thomas Oliphant, musician and author of "Deck the Halls with Boughs of Holly".

References

Jacobite military personnel of the Jacobite rising of 1745
1691 births
1767 deaths
Scottish Jacobites
Lords of Parliament in the Jacobite peerage
Oliphant family